An enzyme modulator is a type of drug which modulates enzymes. They include enzyme inhibitors and enzyme inducers. In an homogeneous assay, "an enzyme modulator ... is covalently linked to the ligand which competes with free ligand from the test sample for the available antibodies."

See also
 Channel modulator
 Receptor modulator
 Transporter modulator

References

Metabolism
Enzyme inhibitors